Esther Brann (July 21, 1899 – January 3, 1998) was an American children’s writer of children's literature and illustrator.

Education 
Brann was born in New York City. She attended the Art Students League of New York, Cooper Union, the National Academy of Design, and the Fontainebleau School of Fine Arts in France.

Career 
After finishing her education in France, Brann returned to New York looking for work as an illustrator. When she could not find work, she decided to work for herself and began writing and illustrating her own books.

Brann was named one of ten national award winners for her children's books.

Personal life
Brann traveled around the world with her husband and son when her husband was enlisted in the Navy. They lived in Guam, Florida, Virginia and California. These travels influenced her writing and illustrations.

Death

Esther Brann Schorr died on January 3, 1998, in Ventura, California.

Works (written and illustrated) 
Nanette of the Wooden Shoes (1922)
A Quebec Sketchbook (1926)
Lupe Goes to School (1930)
Nicolina (1931)
Yann and His Island (1932)
Bobbie and Donnie Were Twins (1933)
Around the World With Esther Brann (1935)
Another New Year With Bobbie and Donnie (1936)
Patrick Was His Name (1938)
Patrick Goes A-Hunting (1940),
Five Puppies for Sale (1948)
Book for Baby

Works (illustrated) 
Edna Albert's Little Pilgrim to Penn's Woods
Edna Albert’s The Shawl with the Yellow Bells
Mary Jane Carr's Children of the Covered Wagon

References 

Ward, Martha E. and Dorothy A. Marquardt. Authors of Books for Young People (Metuchen, N.J: Scarecrow Press) 1971
The H.W. Wilson Company, Junior Book of Authors, 2nd ed.; Junior Authors Electronic (1951), updated 1999.)
Ventura County Star. January 9, 1998.

External links 
 Guide to the Esther Brann papers at the University of Oregon

1899 births
1998 deaths
American children's writers
American children's book illustrators
Artists from New York City
American women illustrators
Art Students League of New York alumni
20th-century American women artists
20th-century American women writers
20th-century illustrators of fairy tales
Writers who illustrated their own writing